Solanum palustre (syn. Solanum brevidens) is a species of wild potato in the family Solanaceae. It is native to central and southern Chile, and Neuquén and Río Negro Provinces of Argentina. Although it does not bear tubers, it is still being extensively studied for its resistance to Potato virus Y, Potato leafroll virus, early blight, late blight, common scab, bacterial soft rot, and frost.

References

palustre
Flora of central Chile
Flora of southern Chile
Flora of South Argentina
Plants described in 1841